Amanda Young is a  fictional character in the Saw franchise. She is portrayed by Shawnee Smith. At first a minor character in the original film, her role expanded to the secondary antagonist in the sequels, giving further backstory for her character.

Fictional character biography

Saw

Amanda's first appearance was as a minor character in the 2004 film Saw. She was the only known survivor of the Jigsaw Killer (John Kramer), a man who abducts people he sees as unappreciative of their lives and forces them into death traps. Her trap is depicted in a flashback while it is described to police and Dr. Lawrence Gordon: she wakes up with a device attached to her head set to wrench her jaws apart; the device is described as a "reverse bear trap". The key is in the stomach of her "dead cellmate", who has actually been heavily sedated; she nevertheless kills him and frees herself moments before the device springs open.

Detective David Tapp comments that Amanda was targeted by Jigsaw for that game because she was a drug addict. At the end of the scene, she remarks that Jigsaw helped her.

Saw II
It is revealed in Saw II that Amanda started using heroin in jail. She was sentenced to prison after being framed by Detective Eric Matthews for a crime she did not commit. She appears in most of the film as one of the subjects John traps in the nerve gas house along with several other people who Eric had framed, as well as the detective's son, Daniel. As the last surviving woman in the nerve gas house, it seems that her character is filling the role of a final girl of the film, yet this is a red herring. In a twist ending, it is revealed that Amanda is working with John, seeing him as a father figure and agreeing to become his apprentice. Amanda claims that the test she experienced in the first film ultimately saved her life, and this is what caused her to join him. She survives the nerve gas house, saved from the violent victim Xavier by Daniel, and upon the arrival of Eric Matthews she abducts him as her first "test subject" and rescues John from his custody. Amanda expresses vengeful tendencies toward Eric as she tells him that the "tables have turned" and that she will make him experience what it is like to be imprisoned, as she traps him in a bathroom to rot. At the end of the film, Amanda claims that she intends to carry on John's work after he dies.

Saw III

Saw III specifies that Amanda had been working with John since the first film, that she kidnapped one of the film's protagonists, Adam Stanheight, and that she had killed him out of guilt shortly after said film. Flashbacks in Saw III also clarify that Eric had escaped from his trap, and engaged in a vicious fight with Amanda for the whereabouts of his son. Amanda succeeded in defeating him, and left Eric for dead.

By the third film, Amanda is depicted as ignoring John's modus operandi by creating inescapable traps that kill the subject regardless of whether or not they successfully complete their test. She also displays tendencies of cutting herself under stress. The dying John decides to put Amanda through a test to see if she is still stable enough to carry on his work by having her work with Dr. Lynn Denlon to keep him alive while she oversees the tests of Jeff Denlon. Amanda acts abusively toward Lynn, jealous of the attention John is giving her, even having a fight with her at one point. At one point, she goes into another room to find an envelope that John told her about before his surgery; she finds a letter inside it which causes her even more distress and, upon reading its contents, she breaks down and cries. While John is being operated on, he becomes delirious and professes his love for his ex-wife Jill Tuck, but which Amanda mistakes as an undeserved professed love for Lynn. Amanda becomes angry and refuses to remove the shotgun collar from Lynn, which will kill her if John flatlines. A heated argument about John's ethics and whether or not Lynn learned anything ensues, revealing that Amanda made her traps inescapable because she felt that the victims wouldn't have learned anything from the test they were put through, and ending with Amanda shooting Lynn in the abdomen just as Jeff walks in. Jeff witnesses this and shoots Amanda in the neck. As she dies, a saddened John explains the nature of her test – Lynn and Jeff are in fact husband and wife – and expresses disappointment at her effectively defeating the point of his actions by giving her victims no chance to learn from their tests.

A deleted scene in Saw III shows Amanda killing Eric, cutting his body several times while on top of him. Darren Lynn Bousman fought to keep this scene in, but the producers removed it because they thought it would be better to leave the door open for Eric's return in Saw IV. Leigh Whannell confirms on the Saw III DVD commentary that Amanda murdering Eric was the first time she killed out of spite and that it was this incident which caused her to stray from John's intentions.

Two deleted scenes were included in the Saw III Director's Cut DVD. The first was a flashback which showed Amanda meeting Adam in his apartment building prior to abducting him for Jigsaw's game. Adam complimented Amanda's hair, gave her a flyer promoting a friend's concert, and took a photo of her. The second deleted scene took place between Amanda and Lynn in which they engaged in a fight that resulted in cuts on Amanda's arms. It is also noted in Leigh Whannell's Saw III commentary that Amanda's character was abused by her dad as a child, though it is never seen in any of the Saw movies.

Saw IV
During Saw IV, Amanda's ability to pick up the much heavier Detective Allison Kerry's unconscious body is questioned by the FBI, leading them to believe another accomplice is helping John. It is discovered that the events of Saw III and Saw IV occurred at the same time, revealing that Amanda was alive during the events of the fourth film. Her blood-covered corpse is found by Agent Peter Strahm in the makeshift operating room just moments after her death. It is later revealed that Detective Mark Hoffman, John's other apprentice, wrote the upsetting letter to Amanda in the previous film.

Saw V
Amanda reappears in Saw V, though only through flashbacks and voice appearances. On August 7, 2008, Shawnee Smith confirmed in an interview with Bloody Disgusting that she had heard she would indeed be featured in the fifth installment of Saw. However, she claimed that she was never on set for the fifth film. Smith guessed that her reappearance will most likely be through the use of archive footage that had been previously filmed.

In the fifth film, Hoffman questioned in a flashback why Amanda would be needed to be involved in the nerve gas house trap (from the second film). Amanda is briefly seen in this flashback, lying unconscious on the ground as John and Hoffman set up that game. In another flashback, in the operating room seen in Saw III, Hoffman questioned John as to why he was letting emotional attachment get in the way of his perception of Amanda. Hoffman also predicted that she would fail John. He then left the room through a secret exit shortly before Amanda entered the room with Lynn.

Saw VI

In Saw VI, a flashback shows that Amanda, desperate for drugs, sent Cecil into Jill Tuck's clinic to steal some for her, making her an accessory in the miscarriage of John's son Gideon in Saw IV.

It is also shown that following Amanda's survival of her test in the first film, John showed Amanda to Jill to prove that his method of rehabilitation was the only one that worked. It is hinted that Amanda was a patient at Jill's clinic once and that Jill had given up on her. Amanda told Jill that John's method helped her.

Amanda appears in a flashback with John and Hoffman as they put Timothy into his trap. It is shown that Amanda and Hoffman, although both apprentices to John, had a very competitive and tense rivalry with each other. Amanda openly expressed doubt in Hoffman's abilities to set up the mechanics of their devices properly, remarking that she thought he was only useful for "heavy lifting". Hoffman in turn openly expressed his dislike for her, saying he was the one who truly cherishes his life. Amanda also questioned whether Hoffman should be tested, reflecting upon the fact that she had already passed a test. Amanda's close emotional attachment and care for John was also further displayed. Amanda appeared awkward and uncomfortable when she and John later ran into Jill as they exited the room. It was also revealed that the masked figure that kidnapped Lynn Denlon in Saw III was Amanda.
 
Another flashback shows Hoffman had plotted to sabotage Amanda's final test in Saw III. Hoffman, knowing of Amanda's involvement in Jill's miscarriage, blackmailed Amanda into killing Lynn through the letter he left for her in Saw IV (read by her in Saw III). In the letter, Hoffman told Amanda he would inform John of Amanda's indirect role in the incident. Feeling the pressure not to disappoint her mentor, Amanda complied with Hoffman's threats and shot Lynn. This resulted in Amanda's failure to pass the final test John had set for her and thus her death.

In the Director's Cut of Saw VI, one of the reinserted scenes presents a dialogue between Amanda and Cecil, in which she persuades him to rob the clinic by claiming, "I've been good to you." Also in the Director's Cut, a scene was added after the end credits in which she approaches the room Corbett Denlon is locked in (during the events of Saw III) and frantically tells her, "Don't trust the one who saves you."

Saw 3D
Amanda appears in a quick flashback of the bathroom at the end of Saw 3D.

Jigsaw
Although Amanda does not appear in the eighth film, Jigsaw, it is revealed that John was assisted by Logan Nelson in preparing the "reverse bear trap" for the game that she survived in the first film.

In other media

Saw: Rebirth
The character of Amanda Young is also featured in the comic book Saw: Rebirth, which is set prior to the events of the first movie. It is revealed that while receiving treatment in hospital for his illness, John Kramer first noticed Amanda. She is portrayed as a fellow patient at the hospital who was being treated for an overdose that she had suffered, due to her drug addiction. John expressed frustration that Amanda did not learn anything from her overdose. This motivated John to design her test which was featured in the first film.

Scott Tibbs' Documentary
Amanda has a brief appearance in the short film Scott Tibbs' Documentary which is available on the Special Edition DVD of Saw II. In the short film, she is being harassed by a news reporter who wants information on her experience when she was captured by Jigsaw. In response, Amanda punches the reporter in the face and storms off.

Saw: The Video Game
Amanda appeared in the video game Saw as the first victim that protagonist David Tapp had to save. Upon being placed in the asylum, she was held in a poison/antidote injection trap to reflect her intravenous drug use habits. Tapp rushes to save her and she proceeds to follow him around the asylum. However, she is soon "abducted" by Pighead, a minion wearing Jigsaw's robes, to cover up Amanda's identity as Jigsaw's apprentice.

Dead by Daylight
Amanda is a playable character in the 2016 video game, Dead by Daylight, as part of the DLC pack titled "The Saw Chapter". She wears a Pighead mask and appears as the killer called "The Pig".

Characterization
Several of the film crew behind the Saw film series have commented on the extent to which Amanda's character had been written to be one of the most important in the franchise. Marcus Dunstan, writer of Saw IV, Saw V, Saw VI, and Saw 3D stated that "Shawnee Smith's character [Amanda] represents a tremendous viable, emotional thread throughout the narratives." Fellow writer of Saw IV, Saw V, Saw VI, and Saw 3D Patrick Melton further stated that "I don't think we could have effectively told the story of Hoffman and John Kramer without including Amanda." Kevin Greutert, the editor of Saw, Saw II, Saw III, and Saw IV, and director of Saw VI and Saw 3D, further stated that "[Smith] did a great job, and [Amanda's] such a peculiar aspect of the Jigsaw character, with the fact that he had these tender feelings for this weirdo."

Speaking about her character, actress Shawnee Smith said that while she was not able to completely identify Amanda with that of herself, she was however, able to perceive several of Amanda's characteristics to be admirable nevertheless. Smith stated that: "When you first meet [Amanda], she's at the bottom, she can't go any lower and it's the combination of that and having nothing left to lose and finding someone to love and to sacrifice for. Obviously she's tragic, but 95% of her was capable of growing the strength to serve and sacrifice for another human being. Now that's rare and it takes strength, courage, practice, diligence, and a fearlessness to build that."

Smith also stated that she attempted to find the human being in Amanda, and tried not to merely turn her into a "super killer". Smith remarked of Amanda's relationship with Jigsaw that it was not so much an apprentice relationship, but that she perceived it as "a true friendship and a real partnership".

Through interviews with Shawnee Smith, it was revealed that Amanda's evolution into the killer she was at the end of Saw III was in part due to a horrible childhood. Smith stated on numerous occasions that Amanda was severely abused and neglected when she was a child. This had been confirmed by Saw series writer and co-creator Leigh Whannell, who also commented on Amanda's past in a commentary for Saw III. In the original script of Saw III, dialogue between John and Amanda made references to her past; in a scene she explains to John that "When I was a little girl, my father would lock me under the stairs. I was terrified of the dark, and he would leave me in there alone. For hours." The scene had explained Amanda's emotional turmoil with the bathroom trap.

Because of her childhood, Amanda had never properly learned to deal with stress and emotional pain, and thus turned to self-harm as a way of dealing with her problems. While in prison, her abusive tendencies were replaced with heroin use. However, after surviving the "reverse bear trap", she no longer used heroin and returned to cutting, burning, and other forms of self-injury. Her frail emotional state and somewhat mental instability made her quick to anger, and she would often act purely on impulse or emotion (such as trying to kill Eric Matthews, and her emotionally and physically abusive behaviour towards Lynn Denlon).

A scene in Saw III explores Amanda's self-injuring tendencies, and shows her cutting the inside of her thigh. The scene was not in the original script, and instead there was a brief scene in which Amanda is shown squeezing a razor blade (which was later replaced by a scene of Amanda squeezing a leather cutter), only hinting at Amanda self-injuring. Prior to filming, Smith had been reading A Bright Red Scream, a book that explains the reasons one would turn to self-injury. It was Smith who insisted that a self-injury scene be filmed and put into the film, believing it was necessary to show Amanda's tendencies for character depth.

Amanda displayed indications of guilt and remorse in her actions, as she had a nightmare of one of her victims in a deleted scene in the director's cut of Saw III. In her dream she was confronted by Adam for what she had done to him, thus further revealing the emotional turmoil that her character exhibited.

Jake Huntley wrote of the complexity of Amanda's character in the Irish Journal of Gothic and Horror Studies. Huntley noted that although Amanda sets herself as notably different from the Jigsaw Killer, her attachment toward him and her desire to be like him are central to her character's state of mind. Huntley stated that:

Huntley further points out that the biggest dilemma that Amanda's character faced is that she lost her sense of "self" following her "reverse bear trap" in the first film. This is characterised by her claim to have been "reborn", symbolising her neurotic desire to be somebody else other than herself. The viewer is confronted with a character who grapples with trying to understand her own identity as she simultaneously attempts to emulate Jigsaw's characteristics, while also setting herself apart as different from him. It is claimed by Huntley that it was this predicament that caused Amanda's gradual emotional breakdown. Huntley stated that:

To add to this, some film critics have interpreted Amanda's character to have suffered from Stockholm syndrome in regards to her complex relationship with John.

Future
In December 2022, Shawnee Smith was reportedly "circling" around an offer to reprise her role as Amanda Young, alongside Tobin Bell who was already confirmed at that time to appear in the upcoming tenth film in the Saw franchise as Jigsaw. In February 2023, it was confirmed that Shawnee Smith returns as Amanda in Saw X.

Symbolic representations

Emulation of Jigsaw's icons
After becoming one of John's apprentices, Amanda often took on many of John's iconic symbols. For instance, she often wore a pig mask when capturing her victims. Also, in Saw III, she appeared wearing John's iconic red and black theatrical robe. Huntley analysed this as an attempt by Amanda to be "dressed as Jigsaw".

Huntley further stated that: "For Amanda, Jigsaw as signifier can only ever stand in the place of a vexatious and frustrating lack and it is this which locates Amanda in such a conflicted position – having given "every cell" of herself to Jigsaw she is only able to act in an imitative and repetitive way, a second, or understudy, in danger of being only slightly more useful than the Billy doll, waiting both for and against Jigsaw's inevitable and impending death."

Inescapable traps
Amanda eventually developed her own unique modus operandi, in which the traps she set were inescapable, and would kill the test subjects even when the victims had achieved the goals of their games. While John always refused to acknowledge his traps as murder, Amanda openly admitted that her actions did define her as a murderer. She chose to execute her subjects because she did not believe anyone would change, including herself.

Huntley pointed out that Amanda's traps are used as a creative tool of juxtaposition with that of Jigsaw's, to effectively point out what the Jigsaw killer was not. Huntley outlined this, stating that: "If Jigsaw's games are encounters with Deleuzian affect, Amanda's games are anti-deleuzian, operating more as encounters with Lacanian notions of the signification of death within the symbolic order and the death drive. This is because Amanda, as a Lacanian subject, becomes caught between her own subjectivity and the object of her desire. In purely cinematic terms, Jigsaw directs his games while Amanda acts in hers... The subjects of Amanda's games, undertaken for Jigsaw, constitute only the throwing away, the discarding... At the most basic level, Amanda does not allow chance or potential to interfere, only ever seeing Jigsaw's games as constitutive of the symbolic order, as an elaborate cover for staging the death of those who lack the survival instinct and thus do not deserve life."

Reception
A film review of Saw III claimed: "I found Amanda the scariest part of the movie, not because Shawnee Smith can match the creepy gravitas of Tobin Bell... but the sheer notion of her transformation. Jigsaw, while not physically powerful has the ability to reproduce his twisted world view in formerly sane people, including the ones he's 'tested.'"

Don Summer, a writer for Best-Horror-Movies.com, commented that Shawnee Smith did a "fantastic job" in her recurring role as Jigsaw's "trusty sidekick", Amanda.

A film critic for the website Angel Fire concurred that Tobin Bell and Shawnee Smith performed very well in their roles. Particularly commenting on the third film, he went on to claim that "while Bell's Jigsaw played a major role in Saw III, most of the film is carried along by Shawnee Smith as Amanda" who he believed presented an "interesting and intriguing character". He also expressed admiration for the manner in which Amanda began as a minor character in the original movie, only to have her character's prominence surely yet gradually increase in the sequels. He claimed that "You've gotta love the way her character has been expanded in the series from a victim in the first "Saw" movie, to a trojan horse in the second film, and to a major player in the third film."

Tobin Bell and Shawnee Smith were nominated for the Spike Scream Award in the category of "Most Vile Villain" for their portrayals of John and Amanda respectively in Saw III.

Following the release of Saw III, film critic David Medsker acknowledged the iconic status that the character had attained, by labelling her as the "poster child for Stockholm syndrome". It has therefore been suggested that she has become a fictional icon of the condition.

In a list compiled by Scott Collura for IGN of the top fifty villainesses in modern popular culture, entitled "Top 50 Chicks Behaving Badly", Amanda Young was ranked as number 42. Collura remarked that Amanda was so villainous that she made "a killer like Jigsaw look like the good guy..."

On Tom Cullen's list of the top five most noteworthy fictional female serial killers, as featured on Asylum, Amanda Young was ranked as number four. In a list that included Sharon Stone's iconic Catherine Tramell, Cullen remarked that of all those featured on his list, Smith's Amanda would be the "most in need of psychiatric help".

Shawnee Smith has been acknowledged as a "scream queen" due to the roles she has played in horror films, which includes her role as Amanda in the Saw films. This culminated in the selection of Smith as a judge and host for the reality series Scream Queens, in which contestants competed for a role in Saw VI.

Smith's depiction of Amanda in the reverse bear trap was used in promotional posters for the first film. The same image also appears on the soundtrack for the first film. A depiction of Amanda in this device was released as a collectable statue by Hollywood Collectables, indicating the iconic status that the character has obtained.

References

Female horror film characters
Fictional serial killers
Fictional kidnappers
Fictional vigilantes
Fictional murderers
Fictional henchmen
Fictional drug addicts
Fictional heroin users
Saw (franchise) characters
Film characters introduced in 2004
Fictional sole survivors
Fictional torturers
Female film villains